Christopher Edward Berkeley Portman, 10th Viscount Portman (born 30 July 1958) is a British peer and property developer.

Biography
Portman is the eldest son of Edward Portman, 9th Viscount Portman by his first wife Rosemary Joy Farris. He was educated at Marlborough College. He inherited the viscountcy on his father's death in 1999.

Portman estate
Viscount Portman and family ranked 33rd in the Sunday Times Rich List 2005, then 40th in the 2006 list – estimated wealth of £1.2 .

This fortune is principally the controlling interest in a  portion of Marylebone, central London, the Portman Estate. The trust is spending £40 million on an investment programme to create a shopping area, Portman Village.

Portman's other assets include shares in commercial properties in New York state and Florida.

Marriages and children
Portman's first wife was Caroline Steenson, and they had one son:
 Hon. Luke Henry Oliver Berkeley Portman (born 1984), heir apparent to the viscountcy.

In 1987, he married the Brazilian Patricia Martins Pim, now Viscountess (Lady) Portman, and they have two sons:
 Hon. Matthew Portman (born 1990)
 Hon. Daniel Portman (born 1995)

Arms

References

External links

1958 births
Living people
Christopher
Viscounts in the Peerage of the United Kingdom
Portman estate
21st-century British landowners
British billionaires
People educated at Canford School

Portman